Karamba may refer to:

Karamba, Senegal, a village in Senegal
Karamba!, a studio album by Bosnian rock band Zabranjeno Pušenje
SuperKaramba, a widget tool
Karamba Diaby (born 1961), a Senegalese-German chemist and politician
Karamba Janneh (born 1989), a Gambian footballer

See also
 Caramba (disambiguation)